The yellow-throated antwren (Myrmotherula ambigua) is a species of bird in the family Thamnophilidae. It is found in the northwestern Amazon Basin (far eastern Colombia, southern Venezuela and Amazonas). Its natural habitat is subtropical or tropical moist lowland forests.

References

yellow-throated antwren
Birds of the Brazilian Amazon
Birds of the Colombian Amazon
Birds of the Venezuelan Amazon
yellow-throated antwren
yellow-throated antwren
Taxonomy articles created by Polbot